The Anacardiaceae, commonly known as the cashew family or sumac family, are a family of flowering plants, including about 83 genera with about 860 known species. Members of the Anacardiaceae bear fruits that are drupes and in some cases produce urushiol, an irritant. The Anacardiaceae include numerous genera, several of which are economically important, notably cashew (in the type genus Anacardium), mango, Chinese lacquer tree,  yellow mombin, Peruvian pepper, poison ivy, poison oak, sumac, smoke tree, marula and cuachalalate.  The genus Pistacia (which includes the pistachio and mastic tree) is now included, but was previously placed in its own family, the Pistaciaceae.

Description

Trees or shrubs, each has inconspicuous flowers and resinous or milky sap that may be highly poisonous, as in black poisonwood and sometimes foul-smelling.
Resin canals located in the inner fibrous bark of the fibrovascular system found in the plant's stems, roots, and leaves are characteristic of all members of this family; resin canals located in the pith are characteristic of many of the cashew family species and several species have them located in the primary cortex or the regular bark.  Tannin sacs are also widespread among the family.

The wood of the Anacardiaceae has the frequent occurrence of simple small holes in the vessels, occasionally in some species side by side with scalariform holes (in Campnosperma, Micronychia, and Heeria argentea (Anaphrenium argenteum).  The simple pits are located along the vessel wall and in contact with the parenchyma.

Leaves are deciduous or evergreen, usually alternate (rarely opposite), estipulate (without stipule) and imparipinnate (rarely paripinnate or bipinnate), usually with opposite leaflets (rarely alternate), while others are trifoliolate or simple or unifoliolate (very rarely simple leaves are palmate). Leaf architecture is very diverse. Primary venation is pinnate (rarely palmate). Secondary venation is eucamptodromous, brochidodromous, craspedodromous or cladodromous (rarely reticulodromous) Cladodromous venation, if present is considered diagnostic for Anacardiaceae.

Flowers grow at the end of a branch or stem or at an angle from where the leaf joins the stem and have bracts.
Often with this family, bisexual and male flowers occur on some plants, and bisexual and female flowers are on others, or flowers have both stamens and pistils (perfect).  A calyx with three to seven cleft sepals and the same number of petals, occasionally no petals, overlap each other in the bud.  Stamens are twice as many or equal to the number of petals, inserted at the base of the fleshy ring or cup-shaped disk, and inserted below the pistil(s).
Stamen stalks are separate, and anthers are able to move.
Flowers have the ovary free, but the petals and stamen are borne on the calyx.
In the stamenate flowers, ovaries are single-celled.  In the pistillate flowers, ovaries are single or sometimes quadri- or quinticelled.  One to three styles and one ovule occur in each cavity.

Fruits rarely open at maturity
and are most often drupes.

Seed coats are very thin or are crust-like. Little or no endosperm is present.   Cotyledons are fleshy.
Seeds are solitary with no albumen around the embryo.

Taxonomy

History 

In 1759, Bernard de Jussieu arranged the plants in the royal garden of the Trianon at Versailles, according to his own scheme. That classification included a description of an order called the Terebintaceæ, which contained a suborder that included Cassuvium (Anacardium), Anacardium (Semecarpus), Mangifera, Connarus, Rhus, and Rourea.  In 1789, Antoine Laurent de Jussieu, nephew of Bernard de Jussieu, published that classification scheme.

Robert Brown described a subset of the Terebintaceae called Cassuvlæ or Anacardeæ in 1818, using the herbarium that was collected by Christen Smith during a fated expedition headed by James Hingston Tuckey to explore the River Congo.  The name and genera were based on the order with the same name that had been described by de Jussieu in 1759.  The herbarium from that expedition contained only one genus from the family, Rhus.

Augustin Pyramus de Candolle in 1824, used Robert Brown's name Cassuvlæ or Anacardeæ, wrote another description of the group, and filled it with the genera Anacardium, Semecarpus, Holigarna, Mangifera, Buchanania, Pistacia, Astronium, Comocladia, and Picramnia.

John Lindley described the "essential character" of the Anacardiaceæ, the "Cashew Tribe" in 1831, adopting the order that was described by de Jussieu, but abandoning the name Terebintaceæ.  He includes the genera that were found in de Candolle's Anacardieæ and Sumachineæ: Anacardium, Holigarna, Mangifera, Rhus, and Mauria.

Phylogeny 
The genus Pistacia has sometimes been separated into its own family, the Pistaciaceae, based on the reduced flower structure, differences in pollen, and the feathery style of the flowers.The nature of its ovary, though,  does suggest it belongs in the Anacardiaceae, a position supported by morphological and molecular studies, and recent classifications have included Pistacia in the Anacardiaceae. The genus Abrahamia was separated from Protorhus in 2004.(Pell 2004)

Subdivision 

The family has been treated as a series of five tribes by Engler, and later into subfamilies by Takhtajan, as Anacardioideae (including tribes Anacardieae, Dobineae, Rhoideae, and Semecarpeae) and Spondiadoideae (including tribe Spondiadeae). Pell's (2008) molecular analysis reinstated the two subfamilies without further division into tribes (Pell 2004). Later, Min and Barfod, in the Flora of China (2008) reinstated the five tribes (four in Anacardioideae), and the single tribe Spondiadeae as Spondiadoideae.

Selected genera

Ecology
The cashew family is more abundant in warm or tropical regions with only a few species living in the temperate zones. Mostly native to tropical Americas, Africa and India.  Pistacia and some species of Rhus can be found in southern Europe,  Rhus species can be found in much of North America and Schinus inhabits South America exclusively.

Uses
Members of this family produce cashew and pistachio nuts, and mango and marula fruits.

Some members produce a viscous or adhesive fluid which turns black and is used as a varnish or for tanning and even as a mordant for red dyes. The sap of Toxicodendron vernicifluum is used to make lacquer for lacquerware and similar products.

Etymology
The name Anacardium, originally from the Greek, refers to the nut, core or heart of the fruit, which is outwardly located: ana means "upward" and -cardium means "heart").

References

Bibliography

 
 
 
 
 
 
 
 
 
 
 
 
 
 
 , in

External links

Tree of Life: Anacardiaceae
Anacardiaceae and Burseraceae research
Anacardiaceae in Topwalks
Anacardiaceae in L. Watson and M.J. Dallwitz (1992 onwards). The families of flowering plants.
Family Anacardiaceae - Flowers in Israel
Anacardiaceae of Chile,  by Chileflora
Anacardiaceae in BoDD – Botanical Dermatology Database
Anacardiaceae at Flickr
Tianlu Min & Anders Barfod. Anacardiaceae at Flora of China, 2008
 pdf

 
Sapindales families